Trimeperidine (Promedol) is an opioid analgesic that is an analogue of prodine. It was developed in the early 1950s in the USSR during research into the related drug pethidine.

Trimeperidine has four structural isomers, of which two are active, the γ isomer trimeperidine, and the β isomer isopromedol. It is around half the potency of morphine as an analgesic, and has been widely used for the treatment of pain.
 
Trimeperidine produces similar effects to other opioids, such as analgesia and sedation, along with side effects such as nausea, itching, vomiting and respiratory depression which may be harmful or fatal.

Trimeperidine is in Schedule I of the Controlled Substances Act 1970 of the United States as a Narcotic with ACSCN 9646 with an annual aggregate manufacturing quota of 2 grams as of 2014.  The free base conversion ratio for salts includes 0.883 for the hydrochloride. Promedol increases  the activity of the reticular activating system in the brain.  It is listed under the Single Convention for the Control of Narcotic Substances 1961 and is controlled in most countries in the same fashion as is morphine or heroin.

References 

4-Phenylpiperidines
Synthetic opioids
Propionate esters
Mu-opioid receptor agonists
Drugs in the Soviet Union
Soviet inventions